Thomas Benjamin Gay Sr. (May 22, 1885 – October 13, 1983) was an American attorney from Richmond, Virginia. He joined the law firm Munford, Hunton, Williams & Anderson (now Hunton Andrews Kurth) in 1908, eventually becoming its first non-founding partner in 1916, and worked there until ill health forced his retirement in May 1983. He was the chair of the American Bar Association's House of Delegates from 1939 to 1941 and was president of the Virginia Bar Association from 1946 to 1947. A graduate of the University of Virginia School of Law, he served for a time on U.Va.'s board of visitors.

Gay died in Richmond on October 13, 1983, and, after services at St. Paul's Episcopal Church, was buried in Hollywood Cemetery.

References

1885 births
1983 deaths
Burials at Hollywood Cemetery (Richmond, Virginia)
People from Richmond, Virginia
University of Virginia School of Law alumni
20th-century American lawyers